Hickory Island is an inhabited island in the Detroit River. It is in Wayne County, in southeast Michigan.

Hickory Island is one of fifteen islands that comprise Grosse Ile. While some are uninhabited, Hickory Island has been developed into residential subdivisions containing "moderately sized homes on smaller lots".

Hickory Island is connected on the north to Meso Island (sometimes called "Upper Hickory"), and from there to Grosse Ile, by the East River Road Bridge. The Hickory Island Park and Yacht Club, located in the center of the island, offers recreational facilities for its residents.

This was one of many such cases around the world which occurred after widespread media coverage of the Utah monolith in November 2020.

References

Islands of Wayne County, Michigan
Islands of the Detroit River
River islands of Michigan
Michigan populated places on the Detroit River